Beta Piscium or β Piscium, formally named Fumalsamakah , is a blue-white hued star in the zodiac constellation of Pisces. Its apparent magnitude is 4.40, meaning it can be faintly seen with the naked eye. Based on parallax measurements taken during the Hipparcos mission, it is about 410 light-years (125 parsecs) distant from the Sun.

Nomenclature 

β Piscium (Latinised to Beta Piscium) is the star's Bayer designation.

It bore the traditional name Fum al Samakah from the Arabic فم السمكة fum al-samakah "mouth of the fish" (compare Fomalhaut). In 2016, the IAU organized a Working Group on Star Names (WGSN) to catalog and standardize proper names for stars. The WGSN approved the name Fumalsamakah for this star on 1 June 2018 and it is now so included in the List of IAU-approved Star Names.

Properties 

Beta Piscium is a Be star, a special class of B-type stars with emission lines in their spectra. It is suspected to be a variable star. Beta Piscium is radiating 524 times the Sun's luminosity from its photosphere at an effective temperature of 15,500 K. The star has a high rate of spin, showing a projected rotational velocity of around 90 km/s. Beta Piscium does not appear to have companion stars.

References

B-type main-sequence stars
Be stars

Pisces (constellation)
Piscium, Beta
BD+03 4818
Piscium, 004
217891
113889
8773
Fumalsamakah